The Journal of Medicine and Philosophy is a bimonthly peer-reviewed medical journal covering bioethics and philosophy of medicine. It was established in 1976 and is published by Oxford University Press. The founding editor-in-chief was Edmund Pellegrino (Georgetown University), and the current one is Mark J. Cherry (St. Edward's University). According to the Journal Citation Reports, the journal has a 2017 impact factor of 0.854.

References

External links

Publications established in 1976
Bimonthly journals
Oxford University Press academic journals
Bioethics journals
Philosophy of medicine
English-language journals
General medical journals